Shanghai Blues (Chinese:上海之夜) is a Hong Kong film directed and produced by Tsui Hark in his producer debut, which had its premiere on September 1984. Kenny Bee, Sylvia Chang and Sally Yeh starred in this film. The music is composed by Wong Jim. The film has been selected as one of the Top 10 Chinese films of 1984 at Hong Kong International Film Festival. This was the first film that Hark produced under his new company, Film Workshop.

Plot
Dung Gwok-man and Aak-suk are both clowns of a night club, after the breaking out of the Second Sino-Japanese War, Gwok-man is inspired by patriotism thought, and prepared for joining the army. The Japanese battleplanes are bombing Shanghai, Gwok-man meet with a young girl named Aak-syu and they agree that they would meet at Suzhou Bridge after the war. Ten years pass, and Gwok-man returns to Shanghai to look for Aak-syu, but only meets several vagrant veterans.

At this time Aak-syu has become a dance hostess at Bat-je-sing Dancery. One day she runs up against Dang-zai, a wandering girl, and she lets Dang-zai live in her room. She never thinks that Gwok-man is in the same apartment. One day Aak-syu's maid is assaulted by a rogue, Aak-syu herself is beaten for helping her. But later Aak-syu sings in an impromptu, and attracts a plutocrat's attention. The plutocrat wants to marry her, but is refused.

Dang-zai takes part in a beauty contest of Calendar Queen by chance. Accidentally, she is chosen as the winner by the wealthy old lady who sponsor the contest. At the same time, "Shanghai Blues", a song composed by Gwok-man, is chosen by a famous singer Zau Siu-sin, and is suddenly popular among the Shanghai people. One day it rains very heavily, Gwok-man and Aak-syu share an umbrella, they return to Gwok-man's home together, but are encountered by Dang-zai, who is in love with Gwok-man unrequitedly. Another day, Gwok-man is saved Ask-syu when she is annoying by some canailles.

Gwok-man and Aak-suk later find a job to make performance for an advertisement. One day when he is performing, Aak-syu happens to pass there in a car. Aak-syu wants to meet Gwok-man, but he hurt's her leg when he jumps out of the car. Dang-zai appears at Calendar Queen party, a rich man fuddles her, so the boss can rape her. But the wealthy old lady drinks the wine mixed with magic potions by mistake and faints on the bed in the boss's room. The drunken Dang-zai falls to the ground, escaped from rape. A power failure occurs that night, the boss mistakes the old lady for Dang Zai, and it ends with a farce. In the same night, Gwok-man and Aak-syu finally recognize each other.

When Aak-syu realize that Dang-zai also love Gwok-man, she decides to leave Shanghai. At the last moment, Gwok-man catches up with the train, to be together with Aak-syu again.

Reception
Andrew Saroch of Far East Films said that "‘Shanghai Blues’ is, overall, superior entertainment, but by the time the end credits roll its  hard not to think of what might have been."

References

External links

1980s Cantonese-language films
1984 films
Hong Kong romantic comedy films
Hong Kong New Wave films
Films directed by Tsui Hark
Second Sino-Japanese War films